"Kemama" is a song performed by Czech singer Benny Cristo. It was chosen to represent the Czech Republic at the Eurovision Song Contest 2020, after winning the country's national final. The song was released as a digital download on 20 January 2020.

Eurovision Song Contest

The song would have represented the Czech Republic in the Eurovision Song Contest 2020 after Benny Cristo was chosen through Eurovision Song CZ, the national selection process organised by Česká televize, to select the Czech Republic's entry for the Eurovision Song Contest. On 28 January 2020, a special allocation draw was held which placed each country into one of the two semi-finals, as well as selecting which half of the show they would perform in. Czech Republic was placed into the second semi-final, to be held on 14 May 2020, and was scheduled to perform in the first half of the show.

Charts

References

2020 singles
2020 songs
Eurovision songs of 2020
Eurovision songs of the Czech Republic
Benny Cristo songs